Rawlinson Range is a mountain range in north-eastern Papua New Guinea.

The range was named after Sir Henry Rawlinson president of the Royal Geographical Society from 1874 to 1875.

References 

Mountain ranges of Papua New Guinea